John Mayhew may refer to:

John Mayhew (musician) (1947–2009), drummer for the progressive rock band Genesis
John Mayhew (cricketer) (1909–1999), English cricketer
John W. Mayhew (1885–1941), former head football coach at Louisiana State University
John Mayhew (Conservative politician) (1884–1954), British politician, MP for East Ham North, 1931–1945
John Mayhew, 18th-century London cabinet-maker, see Ince and Mayhew
John Mayhew (doctor), New Zealand sports physician, formerly chief medical official to the New Zealand national rugby union team